Trojani v Centre public d'aide sociale de Bruxelles (2004) C-456/02 is an EU law case, concerning the free movement of persons and citizenship in the European Union.

Facts
A Salvation Army volunteer, claimed the minimex, the minimum subsistence allowance, from CPAS, the Centre public d'aide sociale de Bruxelles in Belgium. He was French, and went to Belgium in 2000, staying at a camp site in Blankenberge, and then the Jacques Brel youth hostel Brussels. He got accommodation after at the Salvation Army hostel from January 2002. He got board, lodging and pocket money for doing jobs for 30 hours a week, as part of a ‘personal socio-occupational reintegration programme'. CPAS refused because he was not Belgian, and said he could not benefit from the Free Movement of Workers Regulation 1612/68.

Judgment
The Court of Justice, Grand Chamber, held that Mr Trojani would be protected as a worker.

See also

European Union law

Notes

Court of Justice of the European Union case law